Solomon Uriah Yearby (born April 7, 1981 in Birmingham, Alabama) is an American model and basketball player.

Yearby began modeling after hearing a radio advertisement for a Christian modeling agency. He is also a professional American basketball player, playing in the International Basketball League (IBL) for the Eugene Chargers, and in the American Basketball Association (ABA). He has played in the Euroleague, representing countries such as Germany, Italy, Spain, and Sweden. He played college basketball at Campbell University.

References

External links
 

1981 births
Living people
American expatriate basketball people in Germany
American expatriate basketball people in Italy
American expatriate basketball people in Spain
American expatriate basketball people in Sweden
American men's basketball players
Basketball players from Birmingham, Alabama
Campbell Fighting Camels basketball players
Male models from Alabama
Point guards